Patterson Creek is an unincorporated community in Mineral County, West Virginia, United States. It lies at the northeastern end of the county, and is named for Patterson Creek, which empties into the North Branch Potomac River here.

References 

Unincorporated communities in Mineral County, West Virginia
Unincorporated communities in West Virginia
Populated places on the North Branch Potomac River